The Thai football champions are the winners of the highest league in Thai football, which is currently the Thai League 1. Teams in bold are those who won the double of League Championship and Thai FA Cup, or the Asian Double of League Championship and AFC Champions League in that season.

Football was introduced into Thailand in 1897. In 1916, King Vajiravudh founded "The Football Association of Thailand under Patronage of His Majesty the King." After that the association joined the FIFA in 1925 and AFC in 1957.

The Thailand national football team competed at the 1956 Olympics

The first football stadium, Suphachalasai Stadium, was built in 1935. King's Cup, the first football cup was introduced in 1968. And then two years later, Queen's Cup, a national cup competition, started in 1970.

Thailand Soccer League (1996–1997), Thai Premier League (1998–2000)

Thai League (2001–2005)

Thailand Premier League (2006–2008)

Thai Premier League (2009–2015)

Thai League (2016)

Thai League 1 (2017–present)

Italic indicates Double winners - i.e. League and Thai FA Cup winners OR League and Asian Cup winners or League and League Cup

Bold indicates Treble Winners - i.e. League, Thai FA Cup and Asian Cup winners OR League, Thai FA Cup and League Cup

An asterisk (*) after the number of titles won indicates that the team either set or equalled the overall record for championships won in the relevant season.

Total titles won
Ten clubs have been champions.

Kor Royal Cup
The top level of club football competition in 1916-1995.

† Be Champions Together

Total titles won by province
Ten clubs have been champions, from a total of 6 towns and cities. Most have come from the Bangkok.

Total titles won by region
Ten clubs have been champions, from a total of 5 regions. The Bangkok accounts for almost half of all total championship winners with 10 out 13 winners.

See also
 Thai football league system
 Football in Thailand

Thailand
Football in Thailand
Champions